Walfrid Lehto, originally Valfrid Olganpoika, (May 11, 1896 – January 4, 1946) was a Finnish American singer. He is better known by his stage name Volpi Leuto.

Lehto learned to sing in his home town of Hassi, Jämsä, and made a study trip to California in 1926. He settled down in New York City, where he performed at cafes and restaurants. Between 1928 and 1929, Lehto recorded 20 Finnish songs for His Master's Voice and Victor Talking Machine Company in New York. All recordings were made under his stage name Volpi Leuto and some recordings were made with the Finnish-American Östman-Stein Orchestra. For eight years Lehto lived in America and returned to Finland in the 1930s. He was no longer able to sing, and died a poor man in his home town of Hassi.

Discography

July 6, 1928
 Kulkurin masurkka
 Ramona

August 20, 1928
 Angela mia
 Maria Mari

December 10, 1928
 Elomme päivät
 Hyvästi jää

December 18, 1928
 Volgan venemiesten laulu

December 20, 1928
 Vanhat mummot

December 24, 1928
 Aurinkoinen
 Siirtolaisen kaiho

March 7, 1929
 Oi kiitos sä luojani armollinen (together with Margherita Violante)
 Soipa kieli (together with Margherita Violante)
 Tuoll' on mun kultani (together with Margherita Violante)
 Äiti ja kulkuripoika (together with Margherita Violante

April 26, 1929
 Sä olet mielestän kaunihimpi

May 15, 1929
 Tuule tuuli leppeämmmin

June 6, 1929
 Miks' onneansa etsii (together with Annie Mörk)
 Mustalaisruhtinatar (together with med Annie Mörk)

July 5, 1929
 Pyhä napoli
 Pääsky

References

1896 births
1946 deaths
Finnish emigrants to the United States
20th-century Finnish male singers
People from Jämsä